The 1963–64 FA Cup was the 83rd staging of the world's oldest football cup competition, the Football Association Challenge Cup, commonly known as the FA Cup. West Ham United won the competition for the first time (despite having reached the 1923 final), beating Preston North End 3–2 in the final at Wembley.

Matches were scheduled to be played at the stadium of the team named first on the date specified for each round, which was always a Saturday. Some matches, however, might be rescheduled for other days if there were clashes with games for other competitions or the weather was inclement. If scores were level after 90 minutes had been played, a replay would take place at the stadium of the second-named team later the same week.  If scores were level after 90 minutes had been played in a replay, a 30-minute period of extra time would be played.

Calendar

First round proper

At this stage clubs from the Football League Third and Fourth Divisions joined 30 non-league clubs having come through the qualifying rounds with Wimbledon and Sutton United, who given byes, complete this round. Matches were scheduled to be played on Saturday, 16 November 1963, although three games were not played until the midweek fixture. Eight were drawn and went to replays.

Second round 
The matches were scheduled for Saturday, 7 December 1963. Three matches were drawn, with replays taking place later the same week.

Third round 
The 44 First and Second Division clubs entered the competition at this stage. The matches were scheduled for Saturday, 4 January 1964. Nine matches were drawn and went to replays, though none of these then resulted in a second replay.

Fourth round 
The matches were scheduled for Saturday, 25 January 1964. Eight matches were drawn and went to replays. The replays were all played two, three or four days later.

Fifth round 
The matches were scheduled for Saturday, 15 February 1964. The Stoke City – Swansea Town match went to a replay in the midweek fixture, with Swansea winning the tie.

Sixth round

The four quarter-final ties were scheduled to be played on Saturday, 29 February 1964. The Manchester United–Sunderland match went to two replays before the tie was settled, in United's favour.

Semi-finals  

The semi-final matches were played on Saturday, 14 March 1964 with no replays required. Preston North End and West Ham United came through the semi final round to meet at Wembley.

Final 

The 1964 FA Cup final was contested by Preston North End and West Ham United at Wembley on Saturday, 2 May 1964. The match finished 3–2 to West Ham, with the winning goal being scored in the 90th minute.

References
General
The FA Cup Archive at TheFA.com
English FA Cup 1963/64 at Soccerbase
F.A. Cup results 1963/64 at Footballsite
Specific

 
FA Cup seasons
Fa
Eng